Christophe Martichon (born 16 October 1975), better known by his stage name Christophe Maé, is a French pop singer.

Career
Maé learned to play the violin at age five, and later began playing the guitar and harmonica at age 16 after he was immobilised from chronic polyarthritis. He has stated that this was the time when he discovered Stevie Wonder's music which inspired him to take up playing the harmonica. He also discovered Bob Marley's music to whom, years later, he dedicates a song: "Mon père spirituel". It is at the same period that he started playing the guitar. In 2005 he rose to fame by playing the role of Monsieur, brother of King Louis XIV in the musical "Le Roi Soleil", for which he won the NRJ Music Award for revelation of the year 2006.

Releases
Maé's first album was entitled Sa Danse Donne, and released in 2002–2003. This album is not considered his first studio album. He released his first studio album, Mon paradis (My Paradise) on 19 March 2007, with the singles "On s'attache", "Parce qu'on sait jamais" and "Ça fait mal". His fourth single is "Belle Demoiselle". 
Mon Paradis was France's second best-selling album of 2007 after Life in Cartoon Motion by Mika, selling more than 1 600 000 albums to date.

In 2010, Maé's second studio album, On trace la route, was released. It has sold more than 600,000 units to date.

In 2013, Maé's third studio album "Je veux du bonheur ", was released. It ranked number one of the top French album during its first week of release with 103,680 copies to date. The album was sold more than 500,000 units to date in July 2014.

In 2016, Maé's fourth studio album "L'attrape-rêves ", was released. It ranked number one of the top French album for 5 weeks. Until the end of 2016, it has sold 300,000 units to date.

Musical style
Maé's music is largely acoustic. He has cited Bob Marley, Ben Harper, Tracy Chapman, and Jack Johnson as well as French singer-songwriters Francis Cabrel and Gérald De Palmas as musical influences. 
He allegedly began to learn harmonica as a tribute to Stevie Wonder, who is commonly cited as his biggest influence musically.

Personal life
Christophe Maé has two sons, Jules (born March 2008) and Marcel (born August 2013), with his then-longtime girlfriend Nadège Sarron.  Sarron operates a dance school which she founded in Aix-en-Provence, where she lives with her sons. Maé works half the week in Paris, and reunited with his family the rest of the time in the South. He finally proposed to Nadège in 2016 through his song "Ballerine", and the couple married in Porto-Vecchio on 29 June 2017.

Philanthropy
Maé has been a member of the Les Enfoirés charity ensemble since 2008.

Discography

Music albums

Live album

Singles

Awards
NRJ Music Award
 2007: French revelation of the year
 2008: French male artist of the year
 2008: French song of the year for "On s'attache"
 2009: French male artist of the year
 2009: French song of the year for "Belle demoiselle"
 2013: NRJ Award of Honor
 2016: Video of the year for "Il est où le bonheur"
Victoires de la musique
 2008: Public revelation of the year
World Music Awards
 2008: French artist of the year
Others
 2008: Winner of song of the year on TF1
 2014: Winner of song of the year on TF1

References

External links
 Official Website
 Official Myspace

1975 births
Living people
People from Carpentras
French-language singers
French pop singers
World Music Awards winners
Chevaliers of the Ordre des Arts et des Lettres
21st-century French singers
21st-century French male singers